The Presidents Cup is a series of men's golf matches between the United States and the rest of the world, held biennially.

President's Cup may also refer to:

Association football
 President of Ireland's Cup, a competition organised by the Football Association of Ireland
 LFA President's Cup, a competition organised by the Leinster Football Association, Ireland
 AFC President's Cup, a competition between domestic clubs of Asia
 President's Cup (Ghana), an annual match between two Ghana Premier League clubs
 Indonesia President's Cup, a pre-season tournament in Indonesia
 FKF President's Cup, the top knockout tournament of Kenya
 Korea Cup, an international tournament of South Korea
 Malaysian President's Cup, a developmental competition for under-21 players in Malaysia
 President's Cup (Maldives), between the top four teams of Dhivehi Premier League 
 Northern Premier League President's Cup, between teams from Northern Premier League Division One North and South in England
 OFC President's Cup, a competition organized by the Oceania Football Confederation
 Singapore Cup, formerly known as the President's Cup in Singapore
 Suriname President's Cup, a super cup competition organized by the Surinamese Football Association
 Turkish Super Cup, an annual match between the Süper Lig and Turkish Cup winners 
 UAE President's Cup, a tournament in the United Arab Emirates

Ice hockey
 President's Cup (QMJHL), awarded annually to the champion of the Quebec Major Junior Hockey League
 President's Cup (SPHL), awarded to the playoff champions of the Southern Professional Hockey League
 Ray Miron President's Cup, the championship trophy of the Central Hockey League
 Ed Chynoweth Cup, awarded annually to the champion of the Western Hockey League, originally known as the President's Cup
 Lester Patrick Cup, the championship trophy of the Pacific Coast Hockey League and the Western Hockey League, 1949–1974, originally known as the President's Cup

Tennis
 President's Cup (tennis), part of the ATP Challenger Tour in Astana, Kazakhstan
 ATP Tashkent Open, part of the ATP Tour between 1997 and 2002 in Tashkent, Uzbekistan

Other sports
 President's Cup (chess), the United States Chess Federation collegiate championship
 Presidents Cup (box lacrosse), the National Senior level box lacrosse championship for the Canadian Lacrosse Association
 President's Cup (rivalry), an American college football rivalry between the University of Central Oklahoma, and Northeastern State University
 President's Cup (West Indies Cricket), a cricket competition in the West Indies for the 1997–98 season#
 RFL President's Cup. a rugby league competition in the United Kingdom since 2014
 Turkish Basketball President's Cup, the professional men's club super cup competition that takes place each pre season in Turkey

See also
 President's Trophy (disambiguation)
 Presidential Cup Bowl, a postseason American college football bowl game